Zhang Yong (born 25 May 1992) is a Chinese Paralympic athlete. He won the silver medal in the men's marathon T54 event at the 2020 Summer Paralympics held in Tokyo, Japan. He also won two silver medals and two bronze medals at the 2019 World Para Athletics Championships held in Dubai, United Arab Emirates.

At the 2020 Summer Paralympics, he also competed in the men's 400 metres T54, men's 800 metres T54, men's 1500 metres T54 and men's 5000 metres T54 events.

References

External links
 

Living people
1992 births
People from Shangluo
Paralympic medalists in athletics (track and field)
Athletes (track and field) at the 2020 Summer Paralympics
Medalists at the 2020 Summer Paralympics
Paralympic silver medalists for China
Paralympic athletes of China
Medalists at the World Para Athletics Championships